Jhalavarali (pronounced , meaning A moon with the sun's heat), is a ragam in Carnatic music (musical scale of South Indian classical music). It is the 39th Melakarta rāgam in the 72 melakarta rāgam system of Carnatic music.

It is called  in Muthuswami Dikshitar school of Carnatic music.

Structure and Lakshana

It is the 3rd rāgam in the 7th chakra Rishi. The mnemonic name is Rishi-Go. The mnemonic phrase is sa ra ga mi pa dha nu. Its  structure (ascending and descending scale) is as follows (see swaras in Carnatic music for details on below notation and terms):
: 
: 
(the notes in this scale : shuddha rishabham, shuddha gandharam, prati madhyamam, shuddha dhaivatham, kakali nishadham)

As it is a melakarta rāgam, by definition it is a sampoorna rāgam (has all seven notes in ascending and descending scale). It is the prati madhyamam equivalent of Ganamoorti, which is the 3rd melakarta.

Janya rāgams 
Jhalavarali has a few janya rāgams (derived scale) associated with it, of which Varali is very popular. See List of janya rāgams for full list of rāgams associated with Jhalavarali.

Compositions
A few compositions set to Jhalavarali are:

Namami sri rama by Thyagaraja
Madhava dayya by Dr. M. Balamuralikrishna
Anatha rakshaka by Thyagaraja

Related rāgams 
This section covers the theoretical and scientific aspect of this rāgam.

Jhalavarali's notes when shifted using Graha bhedam, yields no other melakarta rāgam, like all 6 rāgams in the Rishi chakra (Salagam, Jalarnavam, Navaneetam, Pavani and Raghupriya being the other 5). Only these rāgams have a gap of 3 notes anywhere in their scale, between G1|to M2. Such a gap does not occur in any other melakarta by definition.

Notes

References

Melakarta ragas